is a Japanese political activist, full-time staff and former Vice-President of the Liberal Democratic Party (LDP). He was Minister for Foreign Affairs from 1998 to 1999 and again from 2007 to 2008, and he is a member of the House of Representatives for Yamaguchi 1st district. He is also the current Deputy President of his political party the Liberal Democratic Party.

Early life and education
Kōmura was born in Ehime Prefecture on 15 March 1942. He graduated from Chuo University's faculty of law.

Career

After graduation, Kōmura passed Japan's bar exam and then immediately entered politics. He was first elected to the House of Representatives in the June 1980 election, and has been re-elected in each election since then. He became Director-General of the Economic Planning Agency (as a Minister of State) in June 1994, Minister for Foreign Affairs in July 1998, and Minister of Justice in December 2000. In August 2007, under Prime Minister Shinzō Abe, he became Minister of Defense. Kōmura leads a small faction of the LDP named after himself and ran for LDP president in 2003, but was defeated by Junichirō Koizumi.

Following Abe's resignation in September 2007, Kōmura became Minister for Foreign Affairs for a second time on 26 September 2007, in the Cabinet of Prime Minister Yasuo Fukuda. He remained in that post until he was replaced by Hirofumi Nakasone in the Cabinet of Tarō Asō, appointed on 24 September 2008. He is vice president of the LDP.

Kōmura is also the President of the Japan-China Friendship Parliamentarians' Union. He is known to have strong ties within China's political circles.

Bibliography

Books

References 

1942 births
Living people
University of Tokyo alumni
Politicians from Ehime Prefecture
Politicians from Yamaguchi Prefecture
Members of the House of Representatives (Japan)
Japanese defense ministers
Foreign ministers of Japan
Ministers of Justice of Japan
Economic planning ministers of Japan
Liberal Democratic Party (Japan) politicians
21st-century Japanese politicians